During the 1992–93 English football season, Charlton Athletic competed in the Football League First Division.

Season summary
In the 1992–93 campaign, Charlton began the season promisingly and looked good bets for promotion in the new Division One (the new name of the old Second Division following the formation of the Premier League). However, the club was forced to sell players such as Rob Lee to help pay for a return to The Valley, which eventually happened in December 1992.

There was a tragedy at the club late on in the season when defender Tommy Caton, who had been out of action due to injury since January 1991, announced his retirement from playing on medical advice in March 1993 having failed to recover full fitness, and he died suddenly at the end of the following month at the age of 30.

Final league table

Results
Charlton Athletic's score comes first

Legend

Football League First Division

FA Cup

League Cup

Anglo-Italian Cup

First-team squad
Squad at end of season

References

Notes

Charlton Athletic F.C. seasons
Charlton Athletic